The 1995 Yale Bulldogs football team represented Yale University in the 1995 NCAA Division I-AA football season.  The Bulldogs were led by 31st-year head coach Carmen Cozza, played their home games at the Yale Bowl and finished in seventh place in the Ivy League with a 2–5 record, 3–7 overall.

Schedule

References

Yale
Yale Bulldogs football seasons
Yale Bulldogs football